Gary Pearce or Pierce may refer to:

 Gary Pearce (rugby) (born 1960), Welsh rugby league footballer
 Gary Pearce (rugby union) (born 1956), English rugby union player 
 Gary Pearce (rower) (born 1944), Australian rower 
 Gary Pierce (born c. 1952), American politician in Arizona
 Gary Pierce (footballer) (born 1951), English former football goalkeeper

See also
 Gary Pierce (born c. 1952), Arizona Corporation Commissioner
 Gareth Peirce (born 1940), British lawyer
 Gareth Pierce (born 1981), Welsh actor